Delta 8 may refer to: 

Delta-8-Tetrahydrocannabinol, a cannabinoid.
Space Delta 8, a United States Space Force unit.